In Recovery is the fifth studio album by American pop punk band Inspection 12, released on May 29, 2001, through Fat Wreck Chords.

It was the final recording with drummer Scott Shad, who died a few months before the album's release.

Critical reception
AllMusic wrote: "Inspection 12's core sound may be melodic punk, awash in harmonies, but they add some intriguing variations to the genre. Screaming guitar solos are not that unique, but it's not everyday one finds a cello opening a punk track, nor a Gregorian-esque chant closing one out."

Track listing
"Secure" – 2:35
"Sweet Sixteen" – 1:35
"Red Letter Day" – 3:38
"Doppelganger" – 1:30
"Secret Identity" – 3:05
"Great Scott" – 2:27
"Leave It To Me" – 3:44
"Hear Anything?" – 2:49
"Photograph" - 3:20
"Immortal Beloved" - 2:08
"To The Victor Go The Spoils" - 2:14
"Elegy" - 6:18

Performance credits
Inspection 12
Dan McLintock – vocals, bass guitar, guitar, moog
Pete Mosely – guitar, vocals, organ, piano
James Trimble – guitar, vocals
Scott Shad – drums, vocals, percussion

Additional musicians
Sean Mackin – violin
Angus Cooke – cello
Tina Rodas – cello
Bobby Davis – trumpet
Tad Hilton – trombone
Anthony Norton – saxophone
Will Blumberg – tribal drumming
Anastasia Specker – backing vocals on "Photograph"
Todd – backing vocals on "Sweet Sixteen"
Tracy Densford – backing vocals on "Sweet Sixteen"
Joey Cape – backing vocals on "Red Letter Day"
Rob Reid – backing vocals on "Leave It To Me"
Jordan McDowell – backing vocals on "Leave It To Me"
Mark O'Quinn – backing vocals on "Hear Anything?"
Jason Lewis – backing vocals on "Hear Anything?"

Technical credits
Angust Cooke – mixer at Orange Whip Studios in Santa Barbara, California, in December 2000
Mark Casselman – mastering engineer at New American Sound, in February 2001

References

External links
Inspection 12 official website

2001 albums
Inspection 12 albums